William Schaffner (born 1937) is an American physician and researcher who specializes in infectious diseases. He is Professor of Preventive Medicine in the Department of Health Policy as well as Professor of Medicine in the Division of Infectious Diseases at the Vanderbilt University School of Medicine. He is the current medical director of the National Foundation for Infectious Diseases, of which he previously served as president.

References

External links
Faculty page

Living people
1937 births
21st-century American physicians
20th-century American physicians
Vanderbilt University faculty
Yale University alumni
Weill Cornell Medical College alumni
American infectious disease physicians